Darlington Joephillip Nagbe (born July 19, 1990) is a professional soccer player who plays as a midfielder for the Columbus Crew in Major League Soccer. Born in Liberia, he represented the United States national team.

Nagbe spent the first seven seasons of his career with the Portland Timbers, winning the MLS Cup with the club in 2015, before being acquired by Atlanta United following the 2017 season.

Early years
Nagbe was born in Liberia and left the country as a five-month-old when his mother fled due to the First Liberian Civil War, taking him and his brother with her. They joined her husband Joe Nagbe, a professional soccer player, and his career took the family to France, Greece, and Switzerland before they eventually settled in the Cleveland area in 2001 when Darlington was 11 years old.

Nagbe grew up in Lakewood, Ohio, where he attended Lakewood High School and then St. Edward High School, scoring 18 goals and adding 10 assists as a senior. He was a member of the Region II ODP team, was a 2007 adidas ESP All-Star and was member of the Ohio North ODP team, as well as winning four Ohio North state club titles with the Cleveland Internationals. Nagbe also participated in the U.S. Soccer Development Academy with the Internationals.

College and amateur career
Nagbe played college soccer at the University of Akron, scoring 19 goals and contributing 19 assists in 73 matches during three collegiate seasons. He was a Soccer America All-Freshman first-team honoree, and was named All-MAC Newcomer of the Year as a freshman in 2008. As a sophomore in 2009, Nagbe was named to the NSCAA All-America Second Team, Soccer America MVP Second Team, Top Drawer Soccer Team of the Season Second Team, All-Great Lakes Region First Team, and All-Mid-American Conference First Team. In 2010, Nagbe helped the Akron Zips to their first national championship, a 1–0 win against Louisville; he was subsequently named to the NSCAA All-America First Team, the All-MAC First Team, the College Cup All-Tournament Team, and was honored with the MAC Hermann Trophy as the 2010 College Soccer Player of the Year.

During his college years, Nagbe also played four seasons with the Cleveland Internationals in the USL Premier Development League, scoring seven goals in 18 league appearances.

Club career

Portland Timbers 

Nagbe was selected by Portland Timbers in the first round (second overall) of the 2011 MLS SuperDraft. After missing the first couple of weeks of the season due to injury, Nagbe made his professional debut on April 2, 2011 in a 1–1 draw with New England Revolution. Nagbe scored his first goal with a volley, which was eventually named the 2011 MLS goal of the year, in a 2–1 loss to Sporting Kansas City on July 2, 2011.

On January 8, 2013, Nagbe was reunited with his coach at Akron, Caleb Porter, after Porter was officially hired by Portland. Nagbe finished the 2013 season with nine goals, the highest total with Portland. He also scored once in the postseason, the first postseason appearance in Portland's history, in the first leg against rivals Seattle Sounders. After the season, Nagbe was awarded with the individual Fair Play Award, after committing only eight fouls and receiving one yellow card in 2,848 minutes of regular-season play. Nagbe was a part of Portland's MLS Cup campaign in 2015, starting all but one game that season. He received the Fair Play Award for the second time in his career, committing only 11 fouls, and not receiving any bookings, which he also accomplished in 2014.

Nagbe was injured after a hard tackle on April 11, 2016, during a game against the LA Galaxy. Nigel de Jong, LA Galaxy midfielder and Netherlands international player, rolled over the ball toward Nagbe's ankle. Nagbe was stretchered off the field and left the stadium in a wheelchair. The injury turned out to be a sprained ankle and he missed just two matches before returning to action. De Jong, who received a yellow card for the tackle, was later suspended for three matches.

In July 2016, he was included in the roster for the 2016 MLS All-Star Game, making the squad for the first time in his career. After the season, Nagbe was close to making a £3 million move to Scottish side Celtic, but the deal fell through, and Nagbe remained with Portland for the 2017 season.

Atlanta United

On December 13, 2017, Atlanta United finalized a trade to acquire Nagbe for $1.05 million in allocation money, with another $600,000 in incentive-based allocation money also going the other way. He joined a prolific Atlanta attack that scored the second-most goals in 2017 under Tata Martino. Nagbe had guaranteed compensation of $620,000 for the 2018 MLS season.

Columbus Crew
On November 13, 2019, Columbus Crew SC acquired Nagbe in exchange for $700,000 in Targeted Allocation Money, $150,000 in General Allocation Money in 2020, $200,000 in Target Allocation Money for the 2021 MLS season, and an international roster spot. Nagbe was reunited with his mentor at Akron, Caleb Porter.
On August 20, 2020, Nagbe scored his first goal for Columbus in a 3–0 win against Chicago Fire. This goal would be named the 2020 MLS goal of the year, Nagbe's second time winning the award after doing so in 2011. At the conclusion of the regular season, Nagbe had the highest pass completion percentage in MLS with 95%, a feat he had previously accomplished in 2017 with the Portland Timbers. After leading the Crew through the regular season and playoffs, he missed the MLS Cup Final with coronavirus Columbus won that game, giving Nagbe his third MLS Cup.

in 2021, Nagbe was an integral part of the Crew team. With injuries plaguing the midfield, Nagbe missed only one game the entirety of the MLS regular season, while also only missing a combined 150 minutes. 

During the 2022 season, Nagbe was named to the MLS All-Star Game, playing the first half of a 2–1 victory against the Liga MX All-Stars

International career
On November 6, 2015, Nagbe was named to the U.S. National Team roster for a pair of 2018 FIFA World Cup qualifying matches against St. Vincent and the Grenadines and Trinidad and Tobago. Nagbe made his international debut on November 13, 2015, coming on as a 64th-minute substitute.

Nagbe scored his first goal for the U.S. National Team on May 25, 2016 in the 90th minute to secure a 1–0 victory in a friendly match against Ecuador. He was added to the squad for the knockout stage of the 2017 CONCACAF Gold Cup, which the United States won. Nagbe started all three games in the knockout stage and was named to the tournament's Best XI. He also took part in the United States' unsuccessful World Cup qualifying campaign, starting seven of 10 matches in the hexagonal as the United States did not qualify for the tournament for the first time since 1986.

Style of play 
A "calming influence in the midfield", Nagbe is a player with "superb technical ability", who is "smooth with the ball" and has a "nose for tempo-setting", which allows him to use his "unflappable composure and high soccer IQ" to take defenders on, or to dribble out of trouble thanks to his "deft first touch" and "fluid comfort on the ball." He is also an "intricate and precise" passer and is someone who is able to "work in tight spaces" and who has the capability to "transition from defense to attack in the blink of an eye" with "an ability to score an occasion goal of the season."

Personal life
Nagbe is the son of Somah Nagbe and Joe Nagbe, the former captain of the Liberian national team. He has two younger sisters, Martha and Seta, and one older brother, Joe Jr. In 2012, he married Felicia Houtz and the couple have a daughter named Mila and sons Kingston and Isaiah.

Nagbe received his U.S. green card in 2012, thus making him a domestic player for MLS roster purposes. Nagbe became a United States citizen in September 2015.

Career statistics

Club

International

International goals
Scores and results list the United States' goal fally first.

Honors
Akron Zips
NCAA Division I Men's Soccer Tournament: 2010

Portland Timbers
MLS Cup: 2015
Western Conference (playoffs): 2015
Western Conference (regular season): 2013, 2017

Atlanta United
MLS Cup: 2018
Campeones Cup: 2019
U.S. Open Cup: 2019

Columbus Crew
MLS Cup: 2020
Campeones Cup: 2021

United States
CONCACAF Gold Cup: 2017

Individual
Hermann Trophy Winner: 2010
MLS Goal of the Year: 2011, 2020
MLS Fair Play Award: 2013, 2015
MLS All-Star: 2016, 2022
CONCACAF Gold Cup Best XI: 2017

References

External links

 
 Akron profile

1990 births
Living people
Liberian footballers
African-American soccer players
American soccer players
American people of Liberian descent
Akron Zips men's soccer players
Cleveland Internationals players
Portland Timbers players
Sportspeople from Monrovia
Portland Timbers draft picks
USL League Two players
Major League Soccer players
Major League Soccer All-Stars
United States men's international soccer players
Copa América Centenario players
2017 CONCACAF Gold Cup players
Association football midfielders
People with acquired American citizenship
CONCACAF Gold Cup-winning players
Atlanta United FC players
All-American men's college soccer players
Hermann Trophy men's winners
Columbus Crew players
Designated Players (MLS)
21st-century African-American sportspeople